Medical Institute Jorhat (MIJ) (also known as  Jorhat Medical Institute) is an institution  imparting medical education, located at Barbheta, Jorhat of Assam in India.

The institute trains Rural health practitioners (RHP), who serve as a medical professional in the  rural areas at  Sub center & PHC level. RHP are trained  practitioners of Allopathic system of medicine.

The course available / trained in the institution  is known as  Diploma in Medicine and Rural Health Care (DMRHC). DMRHC is a three and half years medical course, now known as B.Sc.Community Health and the passed out students are designated as Community Health Officer(CHO) and the CHOs are now practicing at Sub-Centers and PHCs in the various districts of Assam under NHM on contractual basis. Now this course is transferred to a new course known as BSc Family and Community Health and has been withdrawn from the institute.

References

Affiliates of Srimanta Sankaradeva University of Health Sciences
Medical colleges in Assam
Jorhat
Educational institutions in India with year of establishment missing